The 1923 USC Trojans football team represented the University of Southern California (USC) in the 1923 college football season. In their fourth year under head coach Gus Henderson, the Trojans compiled a 6–2 record (2–2 against conference opponents), finished in a tie for fourth place in the Pacific Coast Conference, and outscored their opponents by a combined total of 173 to 62. On October 6, 1923, the Trojans played their first game in the Los Angeles Memorial Coliseum, a 23–7 victory over the Pomona Sagehens.

Schedule

References

USC
USC Trojans football seasons
USC Trojans football